The 36th Federal Congress of the Spanish Socialist Workers' Party was held in Madrid from 2 to 4 July 2004, to renovate the governing bodies of the Spanish Socialist Workers' Party (PSOE) and establish the party's main lines of action and strategy for the next leadership term. It was held shortly after the party's victory in the 2004 general election and saw José Luis Rodríguez Zapatero being re-elected unopposed for a second term as party secretary-general, with 95.8% of the delegate vote in the congress (891 votes) and 4.2% of blank ballots (39).

Candidates

Results

References

2004 in Spain
Political party leadership elections in Spain
PSOE Congresses